John Kellogg Hodgman (born June 3, 1971) is an American author, actor, and humorist. In addition to his published written works, such as The Areas of My Expertise, More Information Than You Require, and That Is All, he is known for his personification of a PC in contrast to Justin Long's personification of a Mac in Apple's "Get a Mac" advertising campaign, and for his work as a contributor on Comedy Central's The Daily Show with Jon Stewart.

His writings have been published in One Story (to which he contributed the debut story "Villanova"), The Paris Review, McSweeney's Quarterly Concern, Wired and The New York Times Magazine, for which he is editor of the humor section. He contributes to This American Life, and CBC Radio One’s Wiretap. His first book and accompanying audio narration, The Areas of My Expertise, a satirical tongue-in-cheek almanac that contains almost no factual information, was published in 2005. His second book, More Information Than You Require, went on sale October 21, 2008.  His third book, That Is All, went on sale November 1, 2011. Vacationland: True Stories from Painful Beaches, a collection of "real life wanderings" about Hodgman's life experiences (especially in Western Massachusetts and coastal Maine) was published on October 24, 2017. Vacationland was a finalist for the 2018 Thurber Prize for American Humor. His most recent book, Medallion Status was released on October 17, 2019.

Hodgman was the headline speaker at the 2009 Radio and Television Correspondents' Association dinner in Washington, D.C.

Early life
Hodgman was born and raised in Brookline, Massachusetts, the son of Eileen (née Callahan), a nurse and educator, and John Francis Hodgman, the President and CEO of the Massachusetts Technology Development Corporation and a professor at Tufts University.  He attended the Heath School and Brookline High School, where he edited the underground magazine Samizdat, named for the grassroots dissident publishing movement produced under the Soviet Bloc.  During his last year of high school, he hosted the weekly Radio Consuelo show on freeform station WMFO in Medford.

In 1994 Hodgman graduated from Yale University with a degree in literature, focusing on literary criticism. Before gaining fame as a writer, Hodgman worked as a literary agent at Writers House in New York City, where he represented Darin Strauss, Deborah Digges, and actor Bruce Campbell, among others. Hodgman has used his experience as an agent in his column "Ask a Former Professional Literary Agent" at McSweeney's Internet Tendency.

Career

Hodgman appeared on The Daily Show on November 16, 2005, to promote his book, The Areas of My Expertise. Host Jon Stewart described the book as "very funny" and said that the section on hobo names in particular was written with "a certain kind of genius." Hodgman has returned to the Daily Show numerous times for "resident expert" interview segments, and has been listed on the show's web site as a contributor.

In 2005, Hodgman played a character named "The Deranged Millionaire" in They Might Be Giants's Venue Songs DVD/CD, narrating in between songs with dialog he co-wrote with the band. The Deranged Millionaire character also appeared on The Daily Show on April 2, 2014.  He also narrated a number of Venue Songs-themed setlists during the band's live shows in 2005, and has introduced the band while in the role of The Deranged Millionaire up to May 16, 2007. Hodgman appeared again with They Might Be Giants on The Late Late Show with Craig Ferguson, on December 11, 2009. Hodgman performed the spoken-word portions of the song "Why Does the Sun Shine?"

In February 2006, Hodgman appeared on Attack of the Show, a show that aired daily on G4, to share some insight with the host and promote his book The Areas of My Expertise. In this appearance, Hodgman recounted the sad tale of the lobster (which he said were actually a small, furry, extinct species, killed and replaced by the creatures we think of as lobsters today) and brought along Jonathan Coulton, a frequent Hodgman collaborator and musical director of the Little Gray Book lectures. Coulton performed a song called "Furry Old Lobster." Also, on October 18, 2008, Hodgman appeared again on Attack of the Show to talk about his newest book, More Information Than You Require.

Hodgman appeared in the North American Get a Mac advertising campaign for Apple Inc., which ran from May 2006 through 2010. In the ads he plays the personification of a PC alongside his Mac counterpart, played by actor Justin Long. In reality, however, Hodgman himself became a Mac user in 1984. On November 10, 2020 he made a surprise brief appearance at the 45:27 mark of Apple's virtual "One More Thing" event, where Apple unveiled its first Macs based on its own Apple silicon chips.

In 2007, Hodgman appeared in the "Bowie" episode of the HBO television series Flight of the Conchords. He played the manager of a musical greeting card company who was considering using one of the band's songs for a greeting card.On October 1, 2008, Boing Boings Xeni Jardin announced the official debut of the web series SPAMasterpiece Theater. Hodgman himself described it as "true tale[s] of romance, adventure, infamy, and low-cost prescription drugs, all culled from the reams of actual, unsolicited emails, received here by us and people like you – what we call SPAM."

Hodgman appeared in the episode "No Exit" of Battlestar Galactica, appearing as the civilian neurosurgeon, Dr. Gerard. He had earlier visited the set in 2005 to write about the show for The New York Times Magazine.

On June 19, 2009, Hodgman was the headline speaker at the 2009 Radio and Television Correspondents' Association dinner in Washington, D.C. Hodgman referred to this event as a "Nerd Prom." Many of his jokes were on the topic of President Barack Obama as the first nerd president, and quizzed the president on his knowledge of Frank Herbert's novel Dune.

Hodgman appeared in the last two episodes of the first season of Bored to Death, "The Case of the Stolen Sperm" and "Take a Dive," as a literary reviewer who wrote a bad review that offended the main character. He returned in the second and third seasons.

Hodgman voice-acted on The Venture Bros. in the episode "Self-Medication" as Dale Hale, an ex-boy detective in therapy following the death of his father. He has since had multiple appearances in Season 5 as O.S.I. operative Snoopy, along with other roles.

Also, during the 61st Primetime Emmy Awards in September 2009, Hodgman provided color commentary with made up trivia about the winners. He reprised this role for the 62nd Primetime Emmy Awards in August 2010.

Because of his continuing support for QI, the BBC's intellectual comedy quiz, to be shown on BBC America, Hodgman was invited to appear on the show. He was the first “fifth panelist" on the program broadcast December 3, 2009 (the usual line-up being Stephen Fry as host, Alan Davies as regular panelist and three guests)—and won, continuing the tradition of a guest winning their "rookie" appearance on the show.

In 2012, Hodgman guest-starred in an episode of Delocated called "Reunion Show," acting as the host of a fictional show-within-a-show. Also in 2012, he appeared as a psychiatrist in an episode of Community called "Curriculum Unavailable."

Hodgman made a guest appearance on the sitcom series Husbands in its second season.

In 2013, Hodgman starred as "Special Agent Henry Topple" in Wired's first scripted web series Codefellas.

Hodgman appeared as public radio personality August Clementine in the episode "Anniversaries" of Parks and Recreation, which aired in February 2014.

Hodgman has a supporting role in the FX comedy Married, which premiered in July 2014.
In December 2014, Hodgman appeared in three episodes of the Amazon Studios series Mozart in the Jungle.

In 2014–2015, Hodgman appeared for three episodes as a fictionalized version of psychiatrist and medical doctor Henry Cotton on the Cinemax series The Knick.

In 2016, Hodgman played the role of Travis, a local television station manager, in four episodes of the second season of Amazon's Red Oaks series.

In November 2017, Hodgman was named one of Portland Magazine's "10 Most Intriguing Mainers."

Netflix special 
Netflix, the American streaming media website, aired the comedy special John Hodgman: Ragnarok on June 20, 2013, as a "Netflix Original". The special featured material from Hodgman's most recent book, That Is All, and his December 21, 2012 show at The Bell House in New York.

Judge John Hodgman podcast 
In 2010, Hodgman began hosting a weekly, comedic court show podcast called Judge John Hodgman. The program features Hodgman acting as a judge (with Jesse Thorn as bailiff) adjudicating real-life disputes within a fictional courtroom setting. The cases answer questions like, "Should the kitchen sink's built-in dispenser be filled with dish soap or hand soap?" and "Can you stop family members from using your childhood nickname?"

In January 2021, the podcast aired its 500th episode. Judge John Hodgman is distributed online by Maximum Fun.

Filmography

Film

Television

Other media appearances

Video game appearances
 2015: Minecraft: Story Mode as Soren the Architect
 A character in the browser-based multiplayer role-playing game Kingdom of Loathing bears the name 'Hodgman, The Hoboverlord' in his honor.

Podcasts and radio appearances
Hodgman has been a guest on radio programs including WBEZ's This American Life, and The Sound of Young America, My Brother, My Brother and Me, WFMU's The Best Show on WFMU, NPR's Wait, Wait, Don't Tell Me, North Carolina Public Radio's The State of Things, Live Wire Radio (Episode 374), and BBC's Museum of Curiosity.

Hodgman has been featured on podcasts including occasional appearances as "Judge John Hodgman" on Jordan, Jesse, Go! which led to a stand-alone podcast produced by Maximum Fun. Hodgman was a guest alongside Jonathan Coulton on episodes of You Look Nice Today. Hodgman was a guest on This Week In Tech with Leo Laporte, Stuff You Should Know, and has been featured on the podcast Boing Boing TV. Hodgman appeared in person and on the NPR radio broadcast of City Arts and Lectures, in a recorded interview by Dave Eggers, in front of a live studio audience on November 10, 2008, at the Herbst Theatre in San Francisco, California. He was a guest on Neil deGrasse Tyson's radio show StarTalk Radio on February 27, 2011. He appeared again on City Arts and Lectures, in front of a live audience at the Nourse Theater, interviewing Adam Savage on May 29, 2013.

Hodgman appeared on Ken Reid's TV Guidance Counselor podcast on September 23, 2016.

Online
 Husbands Guest star, season two
 Patriot Act with Hasan Minhaj Episode "Student Loans"
 Triangulation Episode 72 on October 3, 2012
 the show with zefrank
 TED
 Diggnation Episode 231
 Today in the Past (podcast)
 Two articles on the website Open Letters in the year 2000. In them, he details a family trip to Ocean City, New Jersey shortly after his mother's death, and uses his experiences there as metaphors for life and death.
 Transcript of welcoming remarks at a literary reading shortly after the terrorist attacks of 9/11
 Guest player on HarmonQuest season one as the sandwich sorcerer
 Get a Mac web ads, as PC.
 Judge John Hodgman (podcast)
Get Your Pets: The daytime talk show during which Hodgman interviews cats, dogs, and other pets via Instagram live.

Music
 Hodgman was featured on the track "Question and Answer Time" on MC Frontalot's 2010 album Zero Day.
 Hodgman has appeared in two indie music videos directed by Tom Scharpling. The first was Ted Leo & The Pharmacists "Bottled In Cork," followed by The New Pornographers' "Moves."
 Hodgman appeared in the opening section of Aimee Mann's video for "Charmer" from the album of the same name, also written and directed by Scharpling.
 Hodgman featured on the track "Don't Worry It's Fine" on Jean Grae & Quelle Chris' 2018 album Everything's Fine.

In print

As contributor:
 Hodgman appears on the cover of the February 2007 edition of Wired Magazine, as a contributor to their "What we don't know about..." articles.
 Hodgman oversaw the "True Life Tales" section of the Sunday New York Times Magazine. The section is currently on hiatus. He also writes the "Bonus Advice from Judge John Hodgman" section of "The Ethicist" column by Kwame Appiah in the magazine.
 Hodgman has guest written for the "Sedaratives" section of The Believer. "Sedaratives" is an advice column created by Amy Sedaris.
 Hodgman wrote the Massachusetts chapter in the anthology State by State: A Panoramic Portrait of America.
 Hodgman wrote the introduction to The Laugh-Out-Loud Cats Sell Out (2009), a collection of Adam Koford's Hobotopia comic strips.
 Hodgman founded The Little Gray Book Lectures in Williamsburg, Brooklyn.  The lectures have been on hiatus "for the foreseeable future" as of August 2007.
As author:
 The Areas of My Expertise (2005)
 More Information Than You Require (October 2008)
 That Is All (November 2011)
 Vacationland: True Stories from Painful Beaches (October 2017)
 Medallion Status: True Stories from Secret Rooms (October 2019)

References

External links 

 
 
 
 "Interview with John Hodgman"

1971 births
21st-century American male actors
21st-century American male writers
American humorists
American male film actors
American male television actors
American podcasters
Apple Inc. advertising
Brookline High School alumni
Literary agents
Living people
Male actors from Massachusetts
McSweeney's
Writers from Brookline, Massachusetts
Yale University alumni